Covello may refer to:

Covello, Washington
Aldo Covello, Italian engineer
Alfred V. Covello (born 1933), American judge
Leonard Covello (1887-1982), educator